The Millikin Big Blue are the intercollegiate athletic programs of Millikin University (MU) located in Decatur, Illinois, United States. The Big Blue athletic program is a member of the College Conference of Illinois and Wisconsin (CCIW) and competes at the NCAA Division III level.

History
Millikin University was a member of the National Association of Intercollegiate Athletics (NAIA). Its athletics programs were established together with the university in 1903, with football, men’s basketball and baseball all competing in the University’s first full academic year (1903–04). Since its start, Big Blue athletics has achieved considerable success both as a member of the College Conference of Illinois and Wisconsin (CCIW) and at the national level as a member of the NCAA Division III. The nickname “Big Blue” is generally attributed to Carl Head, a professor of mechanical engineering who used the name on posters during the 1916 football season. Millikin joined the College Conference of Illinois (CCI) on April 26, 1946 as one of its nine charter members (Augustana, Carthage, Elmhurst, Illinois College, Illinois Wesleyan, Lake Forest, Millikin, North Central and Wheaton). The league was renamed the CCIW in 1967 to recognize Carthage, which had moved its campus from Illinois to Wisconsin as well as Carroll’s entrance in 1955. Regarded as “The Best Small College Conference In The Nation,” Millikin is one of four charter members with uninterrupted membership. One of the school's most famous alumni is former NFL wide receiver Jeff Query who played for the Green Bay Packers, Cincinnati Bengals and Washington Redskins.

Sports sponsored

A member of the College Conference of Illinois and Wisconsin, Millikin University sponsors teams in twelve men's and eleven women's NCAA sanctioned sports.

National championships

Team
2004–05: Women's Basketball

Individual

Wrestling
 Bradan Birt - 165 wc. (2021-22)

Men’s Swimming
Rodney Miller – 200 yd. breast (1985–86, 1986–87, 1987–88)
Rodney Miller – 100 yd. breast (1986–87, 1987–88)
Rodney Miller – 200 yd. IM (1987–88)
Scott Walker – 100 fly (1990–91)

Men's track
Carl Alexander – Outdoor 100 m. dash (1997–98)

Notable former athletes
 George Corbett – football player: Chicago Bears running back from 1932–1938
 Sid Gepford – NFL player in 1920
 Lori Kerans – basketball coach, gave Millikin first NCAA D3 national championship win; coached from 1985–2018
 Fred T. Long – Negro league baseball player and college football coach: played four seasons in Negro National League and amassed a 227-151-31 coaching record from 1921–1965 at various colleges including three Black college football national championships (1928, 1932, 1945)
 Harry Long – college football coach, won a Black college football national championship in 1924 as coach of Paul Quinn College; assistant coach to his brother Fred for his 1932 and 1945 championships
 Chuck Martin – football head coach at Miami of Ohio; former coach of Division 2 national champion Grand Valley State
 Danny Moeller – Major League Baseball player, 1907–1916, with Pittsburgh Pirates and Washington Senators
 Jeff Monken – football head coach at United States Military Academy
 Marcia Morey – swimmer at Montreal Olympic Games in 1976 in women's 100m breaststroke and 200m breaststroke;  former American record holder in 200M Breaststroke
 George Musso – football player: Chicago Bears lineman from 1933–1944; nine-year team captain, elected to the Pro Football Hall of Fame in 1982
 Jeff Query – football player: former Green Bay Packers and Cincinnati Bengals wide receiver; 141 receptions for 1,865 yards and 11 touchdowns in 84 career games.
 Mike Rowland – pitcher for San Francisco Giants, 1980–1981
 Don Shroyer – college football coach at Millikin University and Southern Illinois University
 Virgil Wagner – Canadian Football League player, Montreal Alouettes halfback from 1946–54; elected to Canadian Football Hall of Fame in 1980
Art Wilson – Major League Baseball player

References

External links
Official website